Rhino is an abbreviation of rhinoceros. Rhino or The Rhino may also refer to:

People
 Rhino, the stage name of Kenny Earl, heavy metal drummer in the band HolyHell, formerly with the band Manowar
 Rhino, the stage name of Mark Smith (Gladiator) from the British show Gladiators
 Rhino, a nickname of English former footballer Keith Stevens
 John Edwards (musician), bass player for the rock band Status Quo, commonly nicknamed Rhino
 Doug Marshall, American mixed martial artist nicknamed "The Rhino"
 Rhino Page, an American ten-pin bowler
 Larry "Rhino" Reinhardt, guitarist for Iron Butterfly and Captain Beyond
 Rhyno (sometimes spelled Rhino); the ring name of professional wrestler Terry Gerin
 David Unsworth, an ex-Everton footballer's nickname 
Rhino - Skate photographer

Arts, entertainment, and media

Fictional characters
 Rhino (comics), a character from the Marvel Comics universe and sometime-foe of Spider-Man
 Rhino, a character from Bolt (2008 film)
 Rhino, a heavy Soviet tank in Command & Conquer: Red Alert 2
 Rhinos, tanks appearing in the Grand Theft Auto of video games from Grand Theft Auto 3 to Grand Theft Auto: San Andreas
Rhino, a playable character in the game Warframe

Other uses in arts, entertainment, and media
 Rhino Entertainment, a record label company
Rhino!, a 1964 film
"The Rhino", a song by Quasi from their album When the Going Gets Dark

Military 
 Rhino, an informal name of the F/A-18E/F Super Hornet, used to lessen confusion between earlier models of the aircraft
 Rhino, a common nickname for the McDonnell Douglas F-4 Phantom II fighter aircraft
 Rhino APC, a South African armoured personnel carrier
 Rhino Heavy Armoured Car, an experimental World War II armoured car
 Rhino Passive Infrared Defeat System, a military Counter-IED equipment
 Rhino Runner, an armored bus

Sports
 Atlanta Rhinos, a rugby league team in Atlanta, Georgia, USA
 Hampton Roads Rhinos, a proposed National Hockey League expansion team
 Leeds Rhinos, a rugby league team in Leeds, England
 Mid West Rhinos, a men's cricket team in Zimbabwe
 Racine Rhinos, a professional American football team in Racine, Wisconsin, USA
 Rhinos women's cricket team, a women's cricket team in Zimbabwe
 Rochester Rhinos, a soccer team in Rochester, New York, USA
 The Rhinos, a nickname for the Indonesia national rugby union team
 The Rhinos, the nickname for the South Africa national rugby league team

Software
 Rhino (JavaScript engine), a JavaScript engine from Mozilla
 Rhinoceros 3D (typically abbreviated Rhino, or Rhino3D), a 3-D modeling software

Other uses
 RHINO (squat), the oldest squat in Geneva (Switzerland)
 Rhino, a scraping tool used in firefighting
 Rhino, a British slang term for money
 Rhino-, the Greek prefix referring to the nose, such as in rhinoplasty
 Bombardier–Alstom HHP-8, a locomotive with the nickname Rhino
 Chiappa Rhino, an Italian-made revolver with a unique design
 Yamaha Rhino, a small off-road car

See also
 Rhinoceros (disambiguation)
 Rino (disambiguation)